Hawaii v. Standard Oil Co. of Cal., 405 U.S. 251 (1972), was a decision by the United States Supreme Court which held that Section 4 of the Clayton Antitrust Act does not authorize a U.S. state to sue for damages for an injury to its general economy allegedly attributable to a violation of the United States antitrust law.

See also
List of United States Supreme Court cases, volume 405

Further reading

External links

United States Supreme Court cases
United States Supreme Court cases of the Burger Court
United States antitrust case law
Legal history of Hawaii
1972 in United States case law
Chevron Corporation
Standard Oil